Phryneta silacea is a species of beetle in the family Cerambycidae. It was described by Per Olof Christopher Aurivillius in 1907. It is known from Togo and Ghana.

References

Phrynetini
Beetles described in 1907